Automotive fuses are a class of fuses used to protect the wiring and electrical equipment for vehicles. They are generally rated for circuits no higher than 32 volts direct current, but some types are rated for 42-volt electrical systems. They are occasionally used in non-automotive electrical products. Automotive fuses are typically housed inside one or more fuse boxes (also called an integrated power module (IPM)) within the vehicle, typically on one side of the engine compartment and/or under the dash near the steering wheel. Some fuses or circuit breakers may nonetheless be placed elsewhere, such as near the cabin fan or air bag controller. They also exist as circuit breakers that are resettable using a switch.

There may be a fuse for ignition off draw (IOD), which controls the drawing of electric current in a vehicle while it is shut off; removing this fuse while the vehicle is shut off for more than a few weeks will prevent excessive depletion of the battery.

Blade type

Blade fuses (also called spade or plug-in fuses), with a plastic body and two prongs that fit into sockets, are mostly used in automobiles. Other common usage is in equipment with comparatively simple, low voltage DC electrical systems such as towed campers and marine applications such as sailboats and motor boats (typically smaller cabin cruisers).

Each fuse is printed with the rated current in amperes on the top.

These types of fuses come in six different physical dimensions:
 Micro2.
 Micro3.
 LP-mini (APS), also known as low-profile mini. Unofficially, the "low-profile mini" fuse is sometimes incorrectly called "Micro" since the term means smaller than mini, but recently fuses using the Micro name have been released.
 Mini (APM / ATM). The mini fuses were developed in the 1990s.
 Regular (APR / ATC / ATO / ATS) blade-type fuses, also known as standard, were developed in 1976 as ATO by Littelfuse for low voltage use in motor vehicles. Bussmann makes the ATC that also complies with the same ISO 8820-3 and SAE J1284 standards. OptiFuse, a newer entrant in the market, makes regular (APR / ATC / ATO) fuses that meet the same standards. 
 Maxi (APX), heavy-duty.

Mount

Blade type fuses can be mounted in:
 Fuse blocks (made of porcelain, slate, or other refractory material). Fuse blocks offer a method of mounting several fuses together or large fuses separately .
In-line fuse holders, with two standards: IEC publication 257 1968 Amendment no. 2 to this publication dated January 1989 and UL-standard no. 512. They help to save space. An inline fuse is often seen in add-on electrical accessories, where the manufacturer does not know the electrical current limit of the circuit you are going to patch into. This offers sufficient protection for that individual accessory, without regard to any other devices that might share the same circuit.
 Dual slot fuse holders let you turn one fuse slot into two (in some way, similar to a power strip, but for fuses).
Fuse clips. Fuse clips can be inserted into a printed circuit board.

Size groups

Where space permits, a miniature circuit breaker is sometimes used to replace a blade-type fuse in the same fuse holder.

Blade fuses use a common coloring scheme for the Micro2, Micro3, low-profile (LP) Mini, Mini, and regular size fuses, and a partial color similarity with the maxi size fuses. The following table shows the commonly available fuses for each size group.

Regular fuses (ATO) rated 0.5 A, 35 A and 40 A are not mentioned in the DIN standards, but are available in some products from Littelfuse, among others.

Bosch type

Bosch type fuses (also known as continental, torpedo, European, or GBC type fuses) are used in old (often European) automobiles. The physical dimension of this type of fuse is 6×25 mm with conical ends. Bosch type fuses usually use the same color-coding for the rated current. The DIN standard is 72581/1.

Color coding

Lucas type
Lucas type fuses are used in old British-made or assembled automobiles. The physical length of the Lucas ceramic type of fuse is either 1 inch or 1.25 inch, with conical ends. Lucas glass tube fuses have straight ends. Lucas type fuses usually use the same color-coding for the rated current. Lucas fuses have three ratings; the continuous current they are designed to carry, the instantaneous current at which they will fuse, and the continuous current at which they will also fuse. The figure found on Lucas fuses is the continuous fusing current which is twice the continuous ampere rating that the system should be using; this can be a source of confusion when replacing Lucas fuses with non Lucas fuses. The Lucas 1/4" diameter glass tube fuse have a different length as compared to the standard US item. The Lucas 1/4" diameter glass tube fuse is 1 and 5/32" [≈29.4 mm] long, while the US standard 1/4" glass tube fuse is 1-1/4" [≈32.0 mm] long. However many Lucas fuse holders permit the longer US version to be installed easily.

Color coding

Glass tube type

North-American built automobiles up to at least 1986 had electrical systems protected by cylindrical glass cartridge fuses rated 32 volts DC and current ratings from 4 amperes to 30 amperes. These are known as "SFE" fuses, as they were designed by the Society of Fuse Engineers to prevent the insertion of a grossly inadequate or unsafe fuse into the vehicle's fuse panel.
These SFE fuses all have a  inch diameter, and the length varies according to the rating of the fuse.
A 4 A SFE 4 fuse is  inch long (the same dimension as an AGA fuse of any rating),
a 6 A SFE 6 fuse is  inch long,
a 7.5 A SFE 7.5 fuse is  inch long (same as an AGW fuse of any rating),
a 9 A SFE 9 fuse is  inch long (same as an AGW fuse of any rating),
a 14 A SFE 14 fuse is 1 inch long,
a 20 A SFE 20 fuse is 1 inch long (same as an AGC fuse of any rating), and
a 30 A SFE 30 fuse is 1 inches long.

There are a number of lookalike fuses which can easily be confused with these. In general this type of fuse will have an "AG" label of some kind, which originally stood for "Automobile Glass". There are at least seven different sizes of fuses with a 1/4 inch diameter. The fuses listed are the most common for the size, which is always a fast-acting fuse:
 1AG size, type AGA, 1 A to 30 A, 1/4 inch (6.3mm) diameter by  inch (15.9mm) long
 2AG size, type AGB, 0.177" (4.5mm) diameter by 0.588" (14.9mm) long (frequently replaced with 5mm diameter by 15mm long international size fuse (aka 5 x 15mm - now more readily available)
 3AG size, type AGC, 0.125 A to 50 A, 1/4 inch diameter (6.3mm) by 1 inch (31.8mm) long
 4AG size, type AGS,  inch (7.1mm) diameter by 1 inch (31.8mm) long
 5AG size, type AGU, 1 A to 60 A,  inch (10.3mm) diameter by 1 inch (38.1mm) long. Also called "Midget fuses."
 7AG size, type AGW, 1 A to 30 A, 1/4 inch diameter (6.3mm) by  inch (22.2mm) long
 8AG size, type AGX, 1 A to 30 A, 1/4 inch (6.3mm) diameter by 1 inch (25.4mm) long
 9AG size, type AGY, 50 A, 1/4 inch (6.3mm) diameter by 1 inch (36.5mm) long
 UK size, type UK, 35 A to 50 A, 1/4 inch (6.3mm) diameter by 1 inch (31.8mm) long

These and other fuses are still being manufactured for many applications, including for AC circuits and DC uses. Some are time delayed, slow reacting, or have leads for terminals used in circuits without a fuse holder. Many of the fuse dimensions and characteristics are published by the Society of Automotive Engineers as Standard SAE J 554.

Limiter type
Limiter fuses consist of a metal strip for currents over 10 amperes. Also referred to as Current Limiting Fuses, they feature an internal fuse element that melts when current passing through the fuse element is within the specified current limiting range of the fuse. As the fuse element melts, it creates a high resistance to reduce the magnitude and duration of the current flowing through the fuse to protect the electrical circuit and connected equipment. Frequently, these are used in close proximity to starter battery fuse boxes. They are used also in electric vehicles, e.g., in forklift trucks.

See also
 Connectors for car audio
 Fusible link

References

External links
 Littelfuse - blade fuses - Micro2, Micro3, Low Profile Mini, Mini, Regular, Maxi
 Cooper Bussmann - high amp fuses 
 Cooper Bussmann - tube fuses 

Electrical components
Auto parts
Automotive